Howard J. Ford is an English independent filmmaker, writer-director and producer, known especially for his 2021 film The Lockdown Hauntings, starring Tony Todd and Angela Dixon, and was filmed entirely during the COVID-19 lockdown. 
Other works of his include The Dead (2010), starring Prince David Osei and David Dontoh; The Dead 2: India starring Joseph Millson .

Filmography

References

External links
 

English film producers
English film directors
Horror film directors
Living people
Year of birth missing (living people)